Weldon Canyon is the name of two canyons in California.

Los Angeles County
The Old Road, now paralleled by I-5, opened on May 28, 1930, through the canyon as a bypass of the 1910 Newhall Tunnel. This original road through the canyon was 20 feet (6 m) wide and made of concrete. The canyon is named after Arthur Weldon, who helped build the Southern Pacific Railroad's nearby San Fernando Tunnel.

Solano County
Weldon canyon is mentioned in the diaries of Willis Linn Jepson. This canyon is now more commonly called Mix Canyon. Mix Canyon Road runs through it.

References

Santa Susana Mountains
Geography of Los Angeles
Landforms of Los Angeles County, California
Landforms of the San Francisco Bay Area
Canyons and gorges of California
Historic trails and roads in California
Transportation in the San Fernando Valley